Vidyaniketan or Vidya Niketan  Schools are a group of schools in Pune run by the Pune Municipal Corporation (PMC). , there are 15 primary PMC Vidya Niketan schools.

See also 
List of schools in Pune

Schools in Pune